Viacheslav Pavlovich Belavkin (20 May 1946 – 27 November 2012) was a Russian-British professor in applied mathematics at the University of Nottingham.  An active researcher, he was one of the pioneers of quantum probability. His research spanned areas such as quantum filtering, quantum information and quantum chaos.

Biography
He was born in Lviv, and graduated from Moscow State University in 1970 where his teachers include Evgeny Lifshitz, Victor Pavlovich Maslov, Andrey Kolmogorov and Ruslan L. Stratonovich. In the 1980s Belavkin held visiting professorship in the Dublin Institute for Advanced Studies, and the Volterra Centre in Rome before taking up an appointment at the University of Nottingham in 1992. He was promoted to a Chair in Mathematical Physics in 1996. He and Ruslan L. Stratonovich were awarded the State Prize of the Russian Federation (formerly the Lenin Prize) for outstanding achievements in science and technology, in part due to his work on the measurement problem. He is survived by his wife Nadezda Belavkin and son Roman Belavkin.

References

External links

1946 births
2012 deaths
Academics of the University of Nottingham
Lenin Prize winners
State Prize of the Russian Federation laureates
Soviet mathematicians
Moscow State University alumni
Probability theorists
Soviet physicists
20th-century British  physicists
Academics of the Dublin Institute for Advanced Studies